Arbuzovo is a rural locality (a settlement at the railway station) in Starobelitsky Selsoviet Rural Settlement, Konyshyovsky District, Kursk Oblast, Russia. Population:

Geography 
The settlement is located 53 km from the Russia–Ukraine border, 80 km north-west of Kursk, 23 km north-west of the district center – the urban-type settlement Konyshyovka, 4 km from the selsoviet center – Staraya Belitsa.

 Climate
Arbuzovo has a warm-summer humid continental climate (Dfb in the Köppen climate classification).

Transport 
Arbuzovo is located 44 km from the federal route  Ukraine Highway, 49 km from the route  Crimea Highway, 17 km from the route  (Trosna – M3 highway), 6 km from the road of regional importance  (Fatezh – Dmitriyev), 19 km from the road  (Konyshyovka – Zhigayevo – 38K-038), 5.5 km from the road  (Dmitriyev – Beryoza – Menshikovo – Khomutovka), 5 km from the road of intermunicipal significance  (38N-144 – Oleshenka with the access road to Naumovka), on the road  (38N-146 – Arbuzovo – Budanovsky). There is a railway station Arbuzovo in the area of the settlement (railway lines Navlya – Lgov-Kiyevsky and Arbuzovo – Luzhki-Orlovskiye).

The rural locality is situated 85.5 km from Kursk Vostochny Airport, 182 km from Belgorod International Airport and 284 km from Voronezh Peter the Great Airport.

References

Notes

Sources

Rural localities in Konyshyovsky District